Mjell Glacier is a glacier  long, flowing northeast between Mount Bergersen and Isachsen Mountain in the Sør Rondane Mountains of Antarctica. It was mapped by Norwegian cartographers in 1957 from air photos taken by U.S. Navy Operation Highjump in 1946–47, and named "Mjellbreen" (the dry-snow glacier).

See also
 List of glaciers in the Antarctic
 Glaciology

References

Glaciers of Queen Maud Land
Princess Ragnhild Coast